Operation MIKE was a series of American landings at Luzon between 9 January 1945 and 15 August 1945, after the conclusion of Operation KING, which was obligated by General Douglas MacArthur’s insistence that he liberate the entire archipelago. MIKE consisted of seven proposed landings and other operations. Each plan was numbered, but they were executed out of sequence. Operation MIKE was followed by Operation VICTOR.

Operations

MIKE I

The major American landing on Luzon, the principle island of the Philippines. On 9 January 1945, the United States I Corps and XIV Corps performed an amphibious landing at Lingayen Gulf, halfway up the west coast of the island. The Japanese responded with a Kamikaze attack that failed. The operation was concluded with no major contact between the ground forces.

MIKE II

This was a plan for an amphibious landing along the east coast of Luzon early in 1945. It was never executed.

MIKE III

This was a plan for an amphibious assault that was originally scheduled for Batangas, which is southwest of Luzon. This plan was modified by moving the goal to Vigan, but ultimately it was never executed.

MIKE IV

This was a second plan for an amphibious assault on the west coast of Luzon in early 1945. It was never executed.

MIKE V

This was the plan for the consolidation of all operations on Luzon. This included the exceptionally brutal battle of Manila, which was the largest land battle in the Pacific.

MIKE VI

This was the amphibious assault on Luzon at Nasugbu Bay on 31 January 1945. Most of the  11th Airborne Division landed just south of Manila, while the  511th Parachute Infantry Regiment jumped in behind the beach.

MIKE VII

This was the landing of the United States  XI Corps at San Antonio on the west coast of Luzon on 29 January 1945. Subic Bay Naval Base was captured almost immediately, but strong Japanese resistance was met  farther inland at Zig Zag Pass. Tactical air was used to break through the Japanese defenses on 7 February 1945, and the forces moved on towards Manila.

References

 Paul Adkins; Codeword Dictionary: A Compilation of Military and Law Enforcement Codewords from 1904 to the Present; 1997; Motorbooks International Publishers & Wholesalers; Osceola, Wisconsin.

Conflicts in 1945
1945 in the Philippines
South West Pacific theatre of World War II
January 1945 events in Asia